Sardab-e Bala (also Romanized as Sardāb-e Bālā and Sardāb Bālā; also known as Sardāb and Sardāb-e ‘Olyā) is a village in Cheshmeh Langan Rural District, in the Central District of Fereydunshahr County, Isfahan Province, Iran. At the 2006 census, its population was 24, in 8 families.

References 

Populated places in Fereydunshahr County